Dévaványa is a town in northern Békés county, in the Southern Great Plain region of Hungary.

Geography
It covers an area of 216.73 km² and has a population of 8273 people (2008).

Twin towns – sister cities
Dévaványa is twinned with:

  Cristuru Secuiesc, Romania (1994)

External links

  in Hungarian

Populated places in Békés County